Sphecodes biroi is a species of bee in the genus Sphecodes, of the family Halictidae.

References

 http://www.atlashymenoptera.net/biblio/Karunaratne_et_al_2006_Sri_Lanka.pdf
 https://www.academia.edu/7390502/AN_UPDATED_CHECKLIST_OF_BEES_OF_SRI_LANKA_WITH_NEW_RECORDS
 https://www.biolib.cz/en/taxonsubtaxa/id70672/

Halictidae
Hymenoptera of Asia
Insects of Sri Lanka
Insects described in 1909